Gurh is a town and a nagar panchayat in Rewa district in the Indian state of Madhya Pradesh.
It is also famous for the Bhairav Baba statue.Its nearest towns are Manikwar 18 km Mangawan 25 km and Rewa District 23 km.

Geography
It has an average elevation of 305 metres (1,000 feet).

Demographics
 India census, Gurh had a population of 12,445. Males constitute 52% of the population and females 48%. Gurh has an average literacy rate of 57%, lower than the national average of 59.5%: male literacy is 69%, and female literacy is 43%. In Gurh, 17% of the population is under 6 years of age.

Transport

By air

Nearest Airport in Prayagraj, Uttar Pradesh.

By bus
Bus stand available in the city bus stand Gurh.

By Train

References

Cities and towns in Rewa district